The men's tournament in Basketball at the 2013 Southeast Asian Games in Naypyidaw began on 8 December and ended on 16 December. All games were held in the Zayar Thiri Indoor Stadium which hosted both men's and women's tournaments. The Philippines successfully defended the title for the sixteenth time as they went undefeated in the competition.

Venue
The Zayar Thiri Indoor Stadium is located in Naypyidaw. It was the host stadium of the tournament for both men's and women's basketball. It was also the hosts of volleyball, judo, vovinam and pencak silat of the games.

Competition format
All seven teams will play their opponents once. Unlike the past Southeast Asian Games, there were no knockout stages in the tournament. The team that finishes the best record will win the title.
*The team has fewer than two players available to play on the court at some point during the game.**A team cannot put forward at least five players at the start of the game, or its own actions prevent play from being resumed.
In case teams are tied on points, the tiebreaking criteria are used, in order of first application:
Results of the games involving the tied teams (head-to-head records)
Goal average of the games involving the tied teams
Goal average of all of the games played
Points scored
Drawing of lots

Results
All times are Myanmar Standard Time (+6:30).

Note: Vietnam, Laos, Brunei and Timor-Leste did not participate in the men's competition.

|}

Statistical leaders
These are some statistics from the tournament which are top ten averages in points, rebounds and assists. Anthony Dominic Dar from Cambodia led the average points table due to his 117-point performance in 6 games. His teammate Sak Ratana, became first in the tournament's rebounds per game. Malaysia's Ooi Ban Sin led the assists per game with a total of 30, and an average of five.

In other statistics, Anthony Dominic Dar led the free throws percentage at 95%. Ratdech Kruatiwa became number one in outside shooting as he shot 54.8% beyond the three-point line. Sak Ratana also led in offensive and defensive rebounding made, steals and in turnovers. Adhi Pratama Prasetyo Putra and Thach Boroth were both tied at 19, as they made the most fouls in the competition. Marcus Douthit from the Philippines has made the most blocks in the tourney at seven.

Points

Rebounds

Assists

Medal winners
The Philippines had clinched a gold place finish when Malaysia lost to Thailand, but even so, they won all their games. Thailand grabbed their eighth silver medal with a win over Malaysia which replaced them in second place. After 34 years, since the 1979 Southeast Asian Games, the Singaporeans got their second medal in history with a victory over the host nation.

See also
Women's tournament

References

Men's tournament
2013–14 in Philippine basketball
2013–14 in Malaysian basketball
2013–14 in Indonesian basketball
2013–14 in Singaporean basketball
2013–14 in Thai basketball
2013 in Cambodian sport